Maad Saloum (variations :Maad a Saloum, Mad Saloum, Maat Saloum, Bour Saloum, Bur Saloum, etc.) means king of Saloum,  in the Serer language. The ancient Kingdom of Saloum now part of present-day Senegal was a pre-colonial Serer kingdom. Their kings bore the title Maad or Mad (also Maat though rarely used). The royal title was sometimes used interchangeably with that of their ancient kings and landed gentry - the lamanes.

From 1493 to 1969 (the Guelowar period, the last maternal dynasty in Saloum), at least forty-nine kings were crowned Maad Saloum (king of Saloum). During this Guelowar period, Maad Saloum Mbegan Ndour (many variations: Mbégan Ndour or Mbegani Ndour) was the first Serer king of the maternal clan Guelowar to have reigned in Saloum. He ruled from 1493. Maad  Saloum Fode N'Gouye Joof was the last king of Saloum. He reigned from 1935 to 1969 - the year of his death.

Kings of Saloum titled Maad Saloum 
Maad Saloum Mbegan Ndour, king of Saloum (reigned : 1493)
Maad Saloum  Malaw tane Joof, (variation: Maléotane Diouf - French spelling in Senegal), king of Saloum (reigned : 1567)
Maad Saloum  Balleh N'Gougou N'Dao (or Ballé Khordia Ndao), king of Saloum (reigned : 1825-1853)
Maad Saloum  Bala Adam Njie, king of Saloum (reigned : 1853-1856)
Maad Saloum  Kumba N'Dama Mbodj, king of Saloum (reigned : 1856-1859)
Maad Saloum  Samba Laobe Latsouka Fall (not to be confused with the Damel of Cayor), king of Saloum (reigned : 1859-1864)
Maad Saloum  Fode N'Gouye Joof, king of Saloum (reigned : 1935-1969 ; died in 1969)

Notes

Serer royalty
Serer history
Maad